Listed below are some of the popular fishes that may be found in the coastal waters of Mauritius.  Local names are shown in italics. The colours of the fish have been described as observed under normal daylight and might not always match those on some photos that have been taken under water. The feeding habit gives an indication of the bait that might be used, if one intends to go fishing. Squid, octopus, shrimp, and sea-snail flesh are good baits for Carnivorous, Benthivorous, or piscivorous fish. (Small fish, however, should be released!)

Marine fishes of Mauritius

See Also 

 Mascarene Islands
 St Brandon
 Marine Protected Area
 Cargados Carajos
 Mauritius
 Île Raphael
 Avocaré Island
 Permanent Grant
 L'île du Sud
 L'île du Gouvernement
 L'Île Coco

References

Field Guide to Coastal Fishes of Mauritius, Coastal Fisheries Resources & Environment Conservation Project, 2001
Sea Fishes of Mauritius, Michael Atchia, 1984
Poissons Commerciaux du Sud-Ouest de l’océan Indien, Pierre Opic et Al, ORSTOM Editions, 1994
Pêche détente à l’ile Maurice, Jean Marc Van Cauwenberghe

Mauritius
Fauna of Mauritius
Lists of fishes by country